Shahshiri (also Romanized as Shahshīrī; also known as Shamshīrī) is a village in Kuhestan Rural District, Jazmurian District, Rudbar-e Jonubi County, Kerman Province, Iran. At the 2006 census, its population was 87, in 16 families.

References 

Populated places in Rudbar-e Jonubi County